Rafael Andrés Olarra Guerrero (born May 26, 1978) is a former footballer who played as a defender.

Career
Olarra began his career in Audax Italiano. He then spent time with Universidad de Chile, where he made a name for himself and began to play for the national team.

After a transfer to the Maccabi Haifa club from Club Deportivo Universidad Católica at the beginning of the 2005-06 season, Olarra established himself as a force to be reckoned with in Maccabi's defence. Olarra made his international debut on January 31, 1998, against Iran.

Post retirement
Following his retirement, he worked for Fox Sports Chile as a sports commentator and TV host until 2019. Next he joined ESPN.

Honours

Club
Universidad de Chile
 Primera División de Chile (3): 1999, 2000, 2009 Apertura
 Copa Chile (1): 2000

Universidad Católica
 Primera División de Chile (1): 2005 Clausura

Maccabi Haifa
 Israeli Premier League (1): 2005–06
 Toto Cup (1): 2005–06

International
Chile
 Olympic Games:  in 2000 Sydney
 : 
 :

References

External links
 Rafael Olarra at playmakerstats.com (English version of ceroacero.es)
 Rafael Olarra at PartidosdelaRoja (in Spanish)

1978 births
Living people
Footballers from Santiago
Chilean footballers
Chilean expatriate footballers
Chile international footballers
Chile under-20 international footballers
Audax Italiano footballers
Universidad de Chile footballers
CA Osasuna players
Club Atlético Independiente footballers
Club Deportivo Universidad Católica footballers
Maccabi Haifa F.C. players
Unión Española footballers
Chilean Primera División players
La Liga players
Argentine Primera División players
Israeli Premier League players
Expatriate footballers in Spain
Expatriate footballers in Argentina
Expatriate footballers in Israel
Chilean expatriate sportspeople in Spain
Chilean expatriate sportspeople in Argentina
Chilean expatriate sportspeople in Israel
Olympic footballers of Chile
Olympic bronze medalists for Chile
2004 Copa América players
Footballers at the 2000 Summer Olympics
Olympic medalists in football
Medalists at the 2000 Summer Olympics
Chilean people of Basque descent
Chilean people of Spanish descent
Association football defenders
Chilean association football commentators